Hezekiah William Foote (a.k.a. Henry Foote) (1813–1899) was an American Confederate veteran, attorney, planter, slaveholder, and state politician from Mississippi.

Early life
Hezekiah William Foote was born on December 17, 1813, in Chester County, South Carolina. He moved to Macon, Noxubee County, Mississippi as a teenager. He studied the Law and passed the Mississippi Bar.

Career
Foote raised cattle in Noxubee County, becoming the first settler to raise pedigree cattle in Mississippi. Meanwhile, he started a newspaper called The Macon Intelligencer. He then served as Chancery Clerk of Noxubee County and was elected as district judge. He joined the Whig Party and later the Constitutional Union Party. He ran and lost the election to the Mississippi House of Representatives in 1856.

Foote became an ardent secessionist in favor of the Confederate States of America by 1860. During the American Civil War of 1861–1865, he served as a colonel in the Confederate States Army during the Battle of Belmont and the Battle of Shiloh.

Foote was elected as a member of the Mississippi House of Representatives and the Mississippi Senate. He also served as president of the Farmers and Merchants Bank of Macon, Mississippi.

Foote owned four plantations in the Mississippi Delta: 
the Mounds Plantation near Rolling Fork in Sharkey County, Mississippi. 
the Egremont Plantation.
the Hardscramble Plantation.
the Mount Holly Plantation in Foote, Mississippi. He acquired it in the early 1880s.

Foote served as superintendent of the Methodist Sunday School in Macon, Mississippi, for fifty-six years. He was one of the co-founders of Vanderbilt University in Nashville, Tennessee, founded as a Methodist institution, and served on its board of trustees. He was related to Henry S. Foote, the governor of Mississippi from 1852 to 1854, who lived where the campus of Vanderbilt University was established.

Personal life
Foote married Lucinda Frances Dade (1816–1856) in 1836. She inherited 3,000 acres of land in Issaquena County, Mississippi. They had a son, Huger Lee Foote.

Death and legacy
Foote died on January 29, 1899, in Macon, Mississippi, where he was buried. His great-grandson was Shelby Foote, the Civil War author.

References

1813 births
People from Chester County, South Carolina
People from Sharkey County, Mississippi
People from Washington County, Mississippi
Confederate States Army officers
Mississippi Whigs
19th-century American politicians
American lawyers
American planters
American bankers
Mississippi state senators
Vanderbilt University people
Methodists from Mississippi
1899 deaths
Vanderbilt University faculty
People from Macon, Mississippi